is a 2004 Japanese television drama series. It is based on a Japanese novel Suna no Utsuwa.

Cast

 Masahiro Nakai
 Ken Watanabe
 Yasuko Matsuyuki
 Shinji Takeda
 Masaru Nagai
 Kotomi Kyono
 Yoko Moriguchi
 Hidekazu Akai
 Masachika Ichimura
 Isao Natsuyagi
 Yoshio Harada

Awards
7th Nikkan Sports Drama Grand Prix
Won: Best Drama
Won: Best Actor - Masahiro Nakai

References

2004 Japanese television series debuts
2004 Japanese television series endings
Nichiyō Gekijō
Japanese drama television series
Television shows based on Japanese novels